Basileura is a monotypic moth genus of the family Incurvariidae erected by Ebbe Nielsen and Donald R. Davis in 1981. Its only species, Basileura elongata, described by the same authors in the same year, is found in Argentina.

References

Incurvariidae
Adeloidea genera
Monotypic moth genera
Taxa named by Donald R. Davis (entomologist)